The Volcanic Eifel Nature Park lies in the counties of Bernkastel-Wittlich, Cochem-Zell and Vulkaneifel in the German state of Rhineland-Palatinate. The nature park, which is in the Eifel mountains, and which is also a geopark, was inaugurated on 31 May 2010 and has an area of 1,068.24 km².> Its sponsor is the Natur- und Geopark Vulkaneifel GmbH.

The Volcanic Eifel Nature Park incorporates large parts of the Volcanic Eifel and parts of the Volcanic West Eifel with its volcanoes that were still active until about 10,000 years ago numerous maars and lava streams as well as mineral springs and carbonic springs. Red sandstones and marine depositions date to an age of up to 400 million years ago. In addition, the region has a diverse cultural landscape as well as species-rich flora and fauna, extensive forests, mountains and valleys and numerous streams and rivers.

See also 
 List of nature parks in Germany

References

External links 
 Natur- und Geopark Vulkaneifel (Offizielle Homepage)
 Landesverordnung über den „Naturpark Vulkaneifel“ vom 7. Mai 2010 auf rlp.de (PDF; 26 kB)
 Lagekarte des Naturparks Vulkaneifel beim Landschaftsinformationssystem der Naturschutzverwaltung Rheinland-Pfalz auf map1.naturschutz.rlp.de

Nature parks in Rhineland-Palatinate
Geography of the Eifel
Bernkastel-Wittlich
Cochem-Zell
Vulkaneifel